Søvik may refer to:

Places
Søvik, Agder, a village in Kristiansand Municipality, Agder county, Norway
Søvik, Haram, a village in Ålesund Municipality, Møre og Romsdal county, Norway
Søvik, Møre og Romsdal, a village in Sykkylven Municipality, Møre og Romsdal county, Norway
Søvik, Vestland, a village in Bjørnafjorden Municipality, Vestland county, Norway